Naserligan (Naser Gang), named after the leader Naser Dzeljilji, is a criminal gang in Sweden. It is primarily active in Gothenburg. The criminal activities of the gang include drug trafficking, gambling and protection racketing. Several persons in the gang are sentenced for murder and other crimes. Several members are also suspected of armed robbery, Extortion and fraud and are wanted by Interpol. The gang in 2001, was involved in a violent conflict against another gang, Original Gangsters, and it is believed that ethnic overtones added to the conflict. The fight was about the control of the illegal gambling market in Gothenburg and later culminated with an open gunfight in a public beach in Gothenburg.

References
LA Times - Midnight sun has a dark side 

Albanian Mafia
Organized crime groups in Sweden